Sebastian Ogenna Osigwe (born 26 March 1994) is a Nigerian footballer who plays for FC Lugano.

International career
Osigwe was born in Switzerland to an Igbo Nigerian father and Swiss mother. He was called up to represent the Nigeria national team in October 2020.

Honours
Lugano
Swiss Cup: 2021–22

References

External links
 SFL Profile

1994 births
Living people
Swiss men's footballers
Swiss people of Nigerian descent
Association football goalkeepers
Swiss Super League players
Swiss Challenge League players
Swiss 1. Liga (football) players
Swiss Promotion League players
SC Kriens players
FC Lugano players
Sportspeople from Lucerne